Lynn Manning (April 30, 1955 – August 3, 2015) was an American Paralympian, playwright, poet and actor known for his autobiographical work that explores the complexities of life as a blind African-American man.

Biography
Lynn Manning's life was turned upside down when he was left blind after being shot in the face in a Hollywood bar in 1978, when he was 23 years old. He made a name for himself as a playwright and actor. He is best known for his semi-autobiographical work Weights, which premiered in Los Angeles in 2001. The play won three NAACP Theatre Awards including Best Actor for Manning and has since been performed throughout the country, including at the Theater By The Blind in New York City. Manning's last play, Up From The Downs had its world premiere at the Los Angeles Design Center on May 7, 2005.

Early life
Manning was born in Fresno, California and raised in Los Angeles, and had eight siblings. At a young age he and his siblings were placed into foster homes. Aged 23, he lost his eyesight after being shot in the face in a Hollywood bar.

Accomplishments
He is a playwright, poet, actor, and former world champion of blind judo. He represented the United States at the 1988 and 1992 Summer Paralympics, where he took a silver medal in Barcelona.
Lynn achieved the U.S. Olympic Committee's "Blind Male Athlete Of The Year" after winning the Blind Judo World Championship at the 1990 World Victory Games in Holland. He also won the first World Cup for blind judo in Sassarre, Sardinia (Italy) in 1991. Lynn also took Silver at the 1991 Tokyo International Invitational For Blind Judo and Bronzes at The International Blind Sports Association World Championships at Colorado Springs (1995) and Madrid, Spain (1998)  Weights is Manning's first story winning three theatre awards, one being for best actor, and has had 19 of his original plays produced to date. Along with Quentin Drew, he co-founded and served as artistic director for Watts Village Theater Company which brings theater to the under served community of Watts. His poem "The Magic Wand" speaks to the intersectionality of disability and race. His poetry has appeared in many magazines and anthologies, including Staring Back: the Disability Experience from the Inside Out and Grand Passion.

Weights
Manning's play "Weights" was first performed in the year 2000. The play illustrates his life story from a young child in poverty to today, as a blind man writing poetry, plays, appearing in television and commercials, and the suffering and hard times he had encountered throughout his years. Extant Theatre Company produced the UK premiere of "Weights" in 2005 and its subsequent tour. Manning appeared in Extant's tour and a further, unaffiliated production at the Millfield Theatre in London in July 2008.

Personal life
Manning was divorced from his wife, Shirley and lived in Koreatown, on the same block as McCobb Boy's home where he lived as a youth and then worked. He was a member of Screen Actor's Guild, Actors' Equity, and The Actors Studio's West-coast Writers/Directors Unit. He also taught children and adults who are visually impaired martial arts as a sensei of the judo program at the Braille Institute of Los Angeles. He died at the age of 60 from liver cancer on August 3, 2015.

References

External links
Official website
Profile, kennedy-center.org
Profile, weightsoneblindmansjourney.com
Profile, greatleap.org

1955 births
2015 deaths
African-American poets
Male actors from Fresno, California
American blind people
American male judoka
Paralympic judoka of the United States
Judoka at the 1988 Summer Paralympics
Judoka at the 1992 Summer Paralympics
Paralympic silver medalists for the United States
Medalists at the 1992 Summer Paralympics
Deaths from cancer in California
20th-century American poets
20th-century American dramatists and playwrights
Paralympic medalists in judo
Deaths from liver cancer
20th-century American male writers
21st-century American poets
21st-century American dramatists and playwrights
21st-century American male writers
American male poets
American male dramatists and playwrights
African-American dramatists and playwrights
20th-century African-American writers
21st-century African-American writers
African-American male writers